Antanambe may refer to municipalities in Madagascar:

Antanambe, in Analanjirofo
Antanambe, Diana, in Diana Region